Belardery located at 32°46′54″S 148°00′04″ is a cadastral parish in Kennedy County New South Wales.

References

Parishes of Kennedy County